This is a list of Austrian mountaineers. On 5 of the 14 Eight-thousanders Austrians have made the first ascent, more than any other nation can claim. Out of the total of 9 Austrian mountaineers who made first ascents of Eight-thousanders, 3 have been members of the Edelweiss Club Salzburg, an association of mountaineers founded in Salzburg in 1881

Eight-thousanders Austrian First Ascent
Hermann Buhl (1924-1957), first ascent solo and without oxygen of Nanga Parbat (1953) on the 1953 German–Austrian Nanga Parbat expedition, first ascent of Broad Peak (1957)
Kurt Diemberger (born 1932), first ascents of Broad Peak (1957) and Dhaulagiri (1960) 
Fritz Moravec (1922-1997), first ascent of Gasherbrum II together with Josef Larch and Hans Willenpart
Marcus Schmuck (1925-2005), first ascent of Broad Peak (1957), initiator and leader of the OEAV Karakoram Expedition
Herbert Tichy (1912-1987), geologist, writer and mountaineer (first ascent of Cho Oyu, together with Sepp Jöchler)
Fritz Wintersteller (1927-2018), first ascent of Broad Peak (1957)

Other Austrian mountaineers
Hansjörg Auer(1984-2019) Marmolada "Way of the Fish" free solo, Lupghar Sar West in the Karakoram-solo, Howse Peak with David Lama and Jess Roskelley
Peter Aufschnaiter (1899-1973), mountaineer and co-traveller of Heinrich Harrer (Seven Years in Tibet)
Karl Blodig (1859-1956), mountaineer (first to climb all alpine mountains above 4000m)
Paul Grohmann (1838-1908), first ascent of the four highest Dolomites
Peter Habeler (born 1942), first ascent of Mount Everest without oxygen (together with Reinhold Messner)
Heinrich Harrer (1912-2006), mountaineer (first ascent of the Carstensz Pyramid and the Eiger north face) and writer (Seven Years in Tibet)
Conrad Kain (1883-1934), first ascent of Mount Robson
Gerlinde Kaltenbrunner (born 1970), first woman to ascend all Eight-thousanders without supplementary oxygen (2011)
Fritz Kasparek (1910-1954), many first ascents, including the Eiger north face
Markus Kronthaler (1967-2006), Tyrolean mountaineer, ice climber
Moriz von Kuffner(1854-1939) first descent of the Mittellegi Ridge on the Eiger & first ascent of the Arête Kuffner of Mont Maudit
David Lama (1990- 2019) Cerro Torre free climb of the compressor route, Lunag Ri solo climb, Howse Peak climbed but party lost in descent
Paul Preuss (1886-1913), premier rock climber of his time
Ludwig Purtscheller (1849-1900), first ascent of Kilimanjaro in 1889
Christian Stangl (born 1966), speed climber

See also
Mountaineering
List of climbers
List of Austrians

Mountaineers 
Mountaineers
 
Austria